Andira is a genus of flowering plants in the legume family, Fabaceae. It is distributed in the tropical Americas, except for A. inermis, which also occurs in Africa. It was formerly assigned to the tribe Dalbergieae, but recent molecular phylogenetic evidence has placed it in a unique clade named the Andira clade.

Compared to other Faboideae the genus has unusual systems of root nodules and fruits, which are drupes. In most species the fruits are dispersed by bats, and in some they are dispersed by rodents. They may also be dispersed on water.

Plants of the genus are used in traditional medicine in Brazil to treat fever and as purgatives and vermifuges. The treatments are toxic in high doses, however. Chemical compounds isolated from the genus include isoflavones, flavanols, glycosides, pterocarpans, chromone, and ursolic acid.

Species
Andira comprises the following species:

 Andira acuminata Benth.

 Andira anthelmia (Vell.) J.F. Macbr.

 Andira bahiensis N.F. Mattos

 Andira carvalhoi R.T. Penn. & H.C. Lima

 Andira cordata R.T. Penn. & H.C. Lima
 Andira coriacea Pulle—St. Martin rouge
 Andira cubensis Benth.
 Andira cuiabensis Benth.

 Andira fraxinifolia Benth.
 Andira frondosa C. Mart.
 Andira galeottiana Standl.

 Andira grandistipula Amshoff
 Andira handroana N.F. Mattos

 Andira humilis Mart. ex Benth.
 Andira inermis (Wright) DC.—angelin, cabbagebark, cabbagetree
 subsp. glabricalyx R. T. Penn.
 subsp. inermis (Wright) DC.
 subsp. rooseveltii (De Wild.) J. B. Gillett ex Polhill

 Andira kuhlmannii N.F. Mattos
 Andira landroana N.F. Mattos

 Andira legalis (Vell.) Toledo
 Andira macrothyrsa Ducke
 Andira marauensis N.F. Mattos
 Andira micans Taub.
 Andira micrantha Ducke
 Andira multistipula Ducke
 Andira nitida Benth.
 Andira ormosioides Benth.
 Andira paniculata Benth.
 Andira parviflora Ducke
 Andira parvifolia Benth.

 Andira pernambucensis N.F. Mattos
 Andira pisonis Benth.

 Andira riparia Kunth
 Andira rosea Benth.
 Andira sapindoides (DC.) Benth.
 Andira skolemora H. Kost.
 Andira spectabilis Saldanha
 Andira spinulosa Benth.

 Andira surinamensis (Bondt) Pulle
 Andira trifoliolata Ducke
 Andira unifoliolata Ducke
 Andira vermifuga Benth.
 Andira villosa Kleinhoonte

 Andira zehntneri Harms

Nomina Dubia
The following species are of uncertain validity:

 Andira araroba (Aguiar.) See Araroba powder, Mrs. M. Grieve. A Modern Herbal.
 Andira chigorodensis R.T.Penn.
 Andira chiricana Pittier
 Andira harfieldii Leschenault de la Tour
 Andira jaliscensis R.T. Penn.
 Andira macrocarpa R.T.Penn.
 Andira microcarpa Griseb.
 Andira oblonga Benth.
 Andira praecox Arroyo ex R.T. Penn.
 Andira taurotesticulata R.T. Penn.
 Andira tervequinata R.T. Penn., G.A. Aymard & Cuello

References

Faboideae
Taxonomy articles created by Polbot
Fabaceae genera